Southern Hills Country Club is a golf course in Tulsa, Oklahoma.

Southern Hills may also refer to:

 Southern Hills, a region of the Black Hills in South Dakota
 Southern Hills, Roanoke, Virginia, a neighborhood
 Southern Hills Mall, Sioux City, Iowa
 Southern Hills Hospital & Medical Center, Spring Valley, Nevada
 Southern Hills Counseling Center, Southwestern Indiana
 Southern Hills Aquifer, southeastern Louisiana
 Southern Hills Formation, Newfoundland
 Southern Hills Athletic Conference, Ohio

See also
 South Hills (disambiguation)